Mrunalini Desai was a Marathi writer from Maharashtra, India.

The following is a list of her books:

 Āryā Vedavatī (1989)
 Maṇibahan Paṭel (1986)
 Pūrṇāhuti (1979)
 Prītīcī Rīt (1979)
 Pūrṇāhuti (1979)
 Pragatīcyā Nikashāvar (1977)
 Pragatine Panthe (1977)
 Rusavā (1976)
 Ināmadār (1975)
 Bilvadal (1975)
 Strī (1974)
 Rājaghāṭ (1974)
 Ānandayātrā (1973)
 Niśigandha (1973)
 Yoginī (1972)
 Bhagavān Paraśurām (1970)
 Putra Mānavācā (1969)
 Virāṇī (1967)

References

Marathi-language writers
Living people
Year of birth missing (living people)